John Casimir, Count of Erbach-Breuberg (10 August 1584 – 14 January 1627), was a German prince member of the House of Erbach and ruler over Breuberg, Wildenstein and Fürstenau.

Born in Erbach, he was the eleventh child and fourth (but third surviving) son of George III, Count of Erbach-Breuberg and his second wife Anna, a daughter of Frederick Magnus, Count of Solms-Laubach-Sonnenwalde.

Life

After the death of their father, John Casimir and his surviving brothers divided the Erbach domains in 1606: he received the districts of Breuberg and Wildenstein. In 1623, after the death of his eldest brother Frederick Magnus without surviving issue, the remaining brothers divided his domains: John Casimir received the district of Fürstenau.

John Casimir died in Schweidnitz aged 41 and was buried in Michelstadt. Because he never married or had children, his brothers divided his land after his death.

Notes

Counts of Germany
House of Erbach
1584 births
1627 deaths
17th-century German people